Tubutama is a town in Tubutama Municipality, in the north-west of the Mexican state of Sonora. Eusebio Kino, SJ, founded Mission San Pedro y San Pablo del Tubutama in 1691.  Tubutama was the headquarters of religious administration for the entire Pimería Alta during much of the Jesuit and Franciscan period of Spanish colonial rule.  

The main economic activities are cattle raising (11,000 head in 2005) and subsistence farming.

See also
Mission San Pedro y San Pablo del Tubutama

External links
Tubutama, Ayuntamiento Digital (Official Website of Tubutama, Sonora)
Tubutama, Sonora (Enciclopedia de los Municipios de México)
Mission Pedro y San Pablo del Tubutama

Populated places in Sonora
Populated places in the Sonoran Desert of Mexico